Noah is a masculine given name derived from the Biblical figure Noah (נוֹחַ) in Hebrew. It is most likely of Babylonian origin from the word "nukhu" meaning repose or rest, which is possible in view of the Sumerian/Babylonian source of the flood story. Another explanation says that it is derived from the Hebrew root meaning "to comfort" (nahum) with the final consonant dropped. It is also reported that its meaning is pleasant.

Popularity
From 2013 until 2015, the name was the most popular given name for male babies in the US.<ref name="Popularity of Noah in the United States"
In 2013 it was the third most popular name for baby boys in Australia.

In 2021, it became the most popular given name for male babies in England and Wales. Noah was among the five most popular names for Black newborn boys in the American state of Virginia in 2022.

Variants in other languages
 Arabic: نُوحْ (Nūḥ)
 Armenian: Նոյ (Noy)
 Bengali: নূহ (Nooh)
 Bulgarian: Ноа (Noа)
 Catalan: Noè
 Czech: Noe
 Dutch: Noë
 Persian: Noa
 Finnish: Nooa
 French: Noé
 Georgian: ნოე (Noe)
 Greek: Νώε (Noé)
 Hebrew: נֹחַ (Noakh)
 Hindi: नूह (Nooh)
 Hungarian: Noé
 Icelandic: Nói
 Indonesian/Malay : Nuh
 Irish: Naoi
 Italian: Noè
 Latvian: Noass
 Lithuanian: Nojus
 Polish: Noe
 Portuguese: Noé
 Romanian: Noe
 Russian: Ной (Noy)
 Sicilian: Nuè
Somali: Nuux (Nuh)
 Spanish: Noé
 Serbian: Ноје (Noje)
 Telugu: నోవహు (Novahu)
 Turkish: Nuh
 Yoruba: Noa
 Tamil: Nagan

Notable people with this given name "Noah" include

A
Noah Abich (born 1987), Kenyan footballer
Noah Abid (born 2000), Tunisian-Dutch footballer
Noah Ablett (1883–1935), Welsh trade unionist
Noah Abrams (born 1998), English footballer
Noah Adamia (1917–1942), Soviet sniper
Noah Adams, American journalist
Noah Akwu (born 1990), Nigerian sprinter
Noah Alexandersson (born 2001), Swedish footballer
Noah Al-Khulaifi (born 1999), Qatari swimmer
Noah Allen (born 2004), American soccer player
Noah G. Allen (born 1927), American football coach
Noah al-Qudah (1939–2010), Jordanian religious figure
Noah Anderson (born 2001), Australian rules footballer
Noah Answerth (born 1999), Australian rules footballer
Noah Arbit (born 1995), American politician
Noah Armstrong (1823–1907), American miner
Noah Ashenhurst (born 1972), American author
Noah Atubolu (born 2002), German footballer
Noah Augustine (1971–2010), Canadian activist
Noah Awassi (born 1998), German-Beninese footballer
Noah Awuku (born 2000), German-Ghanaian footballer
Noah Ben Azure (born 1960), Ghanaian politician

B
Noah Baerman, American pianist
Noah Balta (born 1999), Australian rules footballer
Noah Barker (born 1992), Canadian rugby union footballer
Noah Barou (1889–1955), Ukrainian trade unionist
Noah Bastian (born 1979), American actor
Noah Baumbach (born 1969), American film director
Noah Baxpöhler (born 1993), German volleyball player
Noah Sarenren Bazee (born 1996), German-Nigerian footballer
Noah Bean (born 1978), American actor
Noah Beauchamp (1785–1842), American blacksmith
Noah Beck (born 2001), American social medial personality
Noah Becker (born 1970), Canadian-American artist
Noah Beery (1882–1946), American actor
Noah Beery Jr. (1913–1994), American actor
Noah Biggs, English medical reformer
Noah Billingsley (born 1997), New Zealand footballer
Noah Bischof (born 2002), Austrian footballer
Noah Bitsch (born 1989), German karateka
Noah Blasucci (born 1999), Swiss-Italian footballer
Noah Boeken (born 1981), Dutch poker player
Noah Botic (born 2002), Australian footballer
Noah Bowman (born 1992), Canadian skier
Noah Bradley, American artist
Noah Bratschi (born 2000), American rock climber
Noah Bridges, English stenographer
Noah Brooks (1830–1903), American journalist
Noah Brosch (born 1948), Israeli astronomer
Noah Brown (disambiguation), multiple people
Noah Kenshin Browne (born 2001), Japanese-Canadian footballer
Noah Bryant (born 1984), American shot putter
Noah Burton (1896–1956), English footballer
Noah Buschel (born 1978), American writer and director
Noah Buxton (1876–1967), English cricketer
Noah Henry Byington (1809–1877), American physician and politician

C
Noah Cantor (born 1971), Canadian football player
Noah Cappe (born 1977), Canadian actor
Noah Carl (born 1990), British sociologist
Noah Carroll, Australian politician
Noah Cates (born 1999), American ice hockey player
Noah Caton (1897–1922), American football player
Noah Centineo (born 1996), American actor
Noah Charney (born 1979), American novelist
Noah Chesmain (born 1997), English footballer
Noah Chilvers (born 2001), English footballer
Noah Chivuta (born 1983), Zambian footballer
Noah Cicero (born 1980), American novelist
Noah Clarke (born 1979), American ice hockey player
Noah B. Cloud (1809–1875), American politician
Noah Cobb (born 2004), American soccer player
Noah Comet, American professor
Noah D. Comstock (1832–1890), American farmer and politician
Noah Cooke (1831–??), English poet
Noah Cowan (1967–2023), Canadian film executive
Noah Crawford (born 1994), American actor
Noah Creshevsky (1945–2020), American composer
Noah Crétier (born 2001), French footballer
Noah Cumberland (born 2001), Australian rules footballer
Noah Cyrus (born 2000), American singer

D
Noah Dahlman (born 1989), American basketball player
Noah Dana-Picard (born 1954), Israeli mathematician
Noah Danby (born 1974), Canadian actor
Noah Davis (disambiguation), multiple people
Noah Dawkins (born 1997), American football player
Noach Dear (1953–2020), American judge
Noah Deledda (born 1978), American sculptor
Noah Delgado (born 1979), American soccer player
Noah De Ridder (born 2003), Belgian footballer
Noah Dickerson (born 1997), American basketball player
Noah Dietrich (1889–1982), American businessman
Noah Diffenbaugh (born 1974), American scientist
Noah Diliberto (born 2001), French footballer
Noah Dobson (born 2000), Canadian ice hockey player
Noah Ernest Dorsey (1873–1959), American physicist
Noah Komla Dzobo (??–2010), Ghanaian religious leader

E
Noah Eagle (born 1997), American sportscaster
Noah Efron (born 1959), American-Israeli professor
Noah Eile (born 2002), Swedish footballer
Noah Elliott (born 1997), American Paralympic snowboarder
Noah Elliss (born 1999), American football player
Noah Emmerich (born 1965), American actor

F
Noah Fadiga (born 1999), Belgian footballer
Noah Falck (born 1977), American poet
Noah Falstein, American video game designer
Noah Fant (born 1997), American football player
Noah Fatar (born 2002), French footballer
Noah Feil (born 1998), German footballer
Noah Feldman (born 1970), American author
Noah Henry Ferry (1831–1863), American general
Noah Fierer, American ecologist
Noah Finkelstein (born 1968), American professor
Noah Fleiss (born 1984), American actor
Noach Flug (1925–2011), Israeli economist
Noah Franke (born 1995), American soccer player
Noah Frick (born 2001), Liechtensteiner footballer
Noah Frommelt (born 2000), Liechtensteiner footballer
Noah Fuson (born 1999), American soccer player

G
Noah Galloway (born 1981), American soldier
Noah Galvin (born 1994), American actor and singer
Noah Gal Gendler (born 1957), Israeli diplomat
Noah Georgeson (born 1975), American musician
Noah Glass, American entrepreneur
Noah Miller Glatfelter (1837–1911), American physician
Noah Goldstein, American record producer
Noah Gordon (disambiguation), multiple people
Noah Graber (born 2001), Liechtensteiner footballer
Noah Gragson (born 1998), American stock car racing driver
Noah Graham (1815–1885), American politician
Noah Gray (born 1999), American football player
Noah Gray-Cabey (born 1995), American actor
Noah K. Green (1808–1886), American politician
Noah Greenberg (1919–1966), American conductor
Noah Gregor (born 1998), Canadian ice hockey player
Noah Grove (born 1999), American ice sled hockey player
Noah Gundersen (born 1989), American singer-songwriter

H
Noah Haidu (born 1972), American pianist
Noah Hallett (born 1997), Canadian football player
Noah Hanifin (born 1997), American ice hockey player
Noah Harlan, American filmmaker
Noah Harms (born 1997), Aruban footballer
Noah Harpster, American actor
Noah Hathaway (born 1971), American actor
Noah Hawley (born 1967), American author
Noah Hegge (born 1999), German canoeist
Noah Henchoz (born 2002), Swiss footballer
Noah Herron (born 1982), American football player
Noah Hershkowitz (1941–2020), American physicist
Noah Heward (born 2000), English rugby union footballer
Noah Hickey (born 1978), New Zealand footballer
Noah Hingley (1796–1877), English industrialist
Noah Hoffman (born 1989), American skier
Noah Holcomb (born 1983), American mountain biker
Noah Horowitz (born 1979), American art historian
Noah Hotham, New Zealand rugby union footballer
Noah Howard (1943–2010), American musician
Noah Huntley (born 1974), English actor
Noah Hutchings (1922–2015), American religious figure

I
Noah Idechong, Palauan activist
Noah Igbinoghene (born 1999), American football player
Noah Isenberg (born 1967), American professor

J
Noah Jackson (born 1951), American football player
Noah James (born 2001), Australian footballer
Noah Z. Jones (born 1973), American animator
Noah Jupe (born 2005), English actor
Noah Juulsen (born 1997), Canadian ice hockey player

K
Noah K (born 1984), American composer
Noah Kahan (born 1997), American singer-songwriter
Noah Kalina (born 1980), American filmmaker
Noah Kareng, Botswanan footballer
Noah Babadi Kasule (born 1985), Ugandan footballer
Noah Katterbach (born 2001), German footballer
Noah Keen (1920–2019), American actor
Noah Kibet (born 2004), Kenyan runner
Noah Kin (born 1994), Finnish-Nigerian rapper
Noah Mawete Kinsiona (born 2005), Belgian footballer
Noah Klieger (1925–2018), Israeli journalist
Noah O. Knight (1929–1951), American soldier
Noah Kool (born 1962), Papua New Guinean politician
Noah Korczowski (born 1994), German footballer
Noah Kraft (born 1987/1988), American entrepreneur

L
Noah Landis, American keyboardist
Noah Levenson (born 1981), American computer programmer
Noah Levine (born 1971), American teacher
Noah Michael Levine (born 1962), American voice actor
Noah Lewis (1890–1961), American musician
Noah Locke (born 1999), American basketball player
Noah Lolesio (born 1999), Australian rugby union footballer
Noah Lomax (born 2001), American actor
Noah Loosli (born 1997), Swiss footballer
Noah Lor, American politician
Noah Lowry (born 1980), American baseball player
Noah Ludlow (1795–1886), American actor
Noah Lukeman (born 1973), American author
Noah Lyles (born 1997), American sprinter
Noah Lyon (born 1979), American artist

M
Noah Malone (born 2001), American Paralympic athlete
Noah Mann (1756–1789), English cricketer
Noah Maposa (born 1985), Botswanan footballer
Noah Martey (born 1995), Ghanaian footballer
Noah Martin (1801–1863), American businessman and politician
Noah Marullo (born 1999), British actor
Noah Mascoll-Gomes (born 1999), Antiguan swimmer
Noah M. Mason (1882–1965), American politician
Noah Mawene (born 2005), English footballer
Noah Mbamba (born 2005), Belgian footballer
Noah McCourt (born 1994), American activist
Noah C. McFarland (1822–1897), American politician
Noah Mckay (1956–2009), Iranian-American physician
Noah Meier (born 2002), Swiss ice hockey player
Noah Merl (born 1983), American soccer player
Noah Michel (born 1995), German footballer
Noah Mickens, American performance artist
Noah Miller (water polo) (born 1980), Canadian water polo player
Noah Miller (baseball) (born 2002), American baseball player
Noah Mills (born 1983), Canadian model and actor
Noah Mintz, Canadian singer-songwriter
Noah Mozes (1912–1985), Israeli publisher
Noah Mullins (1918–1998), American football player
Noah Munck (born 1996), American actor
Noah Musingku, Solomon Island religious figure

N
Noah Nadje (born 2003), French footballer
Noah Naujoks (born 2002), Dutch footballer
Noah Naylor (born 2000), Canadian baseball player
Noah Ngeny (born 1978), Kenyan athlete
Noah Noble (1794–1844), American politician
Noah North (1809–1880), American painter
Noah Norton (1786–1877), American prospector
Noah Nurmi (born 2001), Finnish footballer

O
Noah Ohio (born 2003), Dutch-English footballer
Noah Okafor (born 2000), Swiss footballer
Noah Oppenheim (born 1978), American television producer
Noah Östlund (born 2004), Swedish ice hockey player

P
Noah Pagden (born 2001), Australian footballer
Noah Palmer (born 1983), American soccer player
Noah Paravicini (born 1997), American soccer player
Noah W. Parden (1868–1944), American attorney and politician
Noah Persson (born 2003), Swedish footballer
Noah Phelps (1740–1809), American general
Noah Phelps (Wisconsin politician) (1808–1896), American politician
Noah J. Phillips (born 1978), American attorney
Noah Picton (born 1995), Canadian football player
Noah Pilato (born 1996), American soccer player
Noah Pink, American screenwriter
Noah Plume (born 1996), German footballer
Noah Porter (1811–1892), American writer
Noah Powder (born 1998), American soccer player
Noah Pransky, American news correspondent
Noah Preminger (born 1986), American saxophonist
Noah Prince (1797–1872), American politician and judge
Noach Pryłucki (1882–1941), Polish politician
Noah Purcell (born 1980), American attorney
Noah Purifoy (1917–2004), American artist

R
Noah Raby (1822–1904), American longevity claimant
Noah Raford (born 1978), American futurist
Noah Raveyre (born 2005), French footballer
Noah Reid (born 1987), Canadian actor and musician
Noah Richler, Canadian author 
Noah Ringer (born 1996), American actor
Noah Robbins (born 1990), American actor
Noah Robertson (born 1983), American drummer
Noah Rod (born 1996), Swiss ice hockey player
Noah John Rondeau (1883–1967), American hermit
Noah Hamilton Rose (1874–1952), American painter
Noah Rosenberg, American geneticist
Noah Rossler (born 2003), Luxembourgish footballer
Noah Rothman (born 1981), American political commentator
Noah Rubin (disambiguation), multiple people
Noah Rupp (born 2003), Swiss footballer

S 
Noah Sadaoui (born 1993), Moroccan footballer
Noah Sadiki (born 2004), Belgian footballer
Noah Sahsah (born 2005), Danish footballer
Noah Sanford (born 1990), American attorney and politician
Noah W. Sawyer (1877–1957), American educator and politician
Noah Scalin (born 1972), American artist
Noah Scherer (born 1992), Swiss skater
Noah Schmitt (born 1999), German footballer
Noah Schnacky (born 1997), American singer-songwriter
Noah Schnapp (born 2004), American actor
Noah Schneeberger (born 1988), Swiss ice hockey player
Noah Schultz (born 2003), American baseball player
Noah Schwartz (born 1983), American poker player
Noah Ryan Scott (born 2000), Canadian actor
Noah Segan (born 1983), American actor
Noah Sete (born 1981), Australian rugby league footballer
Noah Sewell (born 2002), American football player
Noah Shachtman, American journalist
Noah Shain, American record producer
Noah Shakespeare (1839–1921), Canadian politician
Noah Sheldon (born 1975), American photographer
Noah Shepard (born 1986), American football player
Noah Sife, American actor
Noah Skaalum (born 1995), Danish singer
Noah Smith (disambiguation), multiple people
Noah Smithwick (1808–1899), American colonist
Noah Söderberg (born 2001), Swiss footballer
Noah Solomon (born 1973), Israeli-American musician
Noah Solskjær (born 2000), Norwegian footballer
Noah Song (born 1997), American baseball player
Noah Spence (born 1994), American football player
Noah Starr (born 1980), American actor
Noah Steiner (born 1999), Austrian footballer
Noah Stewart (born 1978), American tenor
Noah Stoddard (1755–1850), American privateer
Noah Strycker (born 1986), American birdwatcher
Noah Sonko Sundberg (born 1996), Swedish footballer
Noah Haynes Swayne (1804–1884), American politician
Noah S. Sweat (1922–1996), American judge
Noah Syndergaard (born 1992), American baseball player

T
Noah Taylor (born 1969), English-Australian actor
Noah Tepperberg (born 1975), American businessman
Noah Thomas (1720–1792), Welsh physician
Noah Davis Thompson (??–1933), American writer
Noah Timmins (1867–1936), Canadian mining financier
Noah Togiai (born 1997), American football player
Noah Nirmal Tom (born 1994), Indian athlete
Noah Toribio (born 1999), English footballer
Noah Troyer (1831–1886), American farmer
Noah Andre Trudeau (born 1949), American historian

U
Noah Urrea (born 2001), American actor

V
Noah Van Sciver (born 1984), American cartoonist
Noah Verhoeven (born 1999), Canadian soccer player
Noah Virgin (1812–1892), American miller
Noah Vonleh (born 1995), American basketball player
Noah von Williamsburg (1539–??), German noble

W
Noah Waddell (born 2001), American pianist
Noah Wafula (born 1990), Kenyan footballer
Noah Wallace (born 1991), American skier
Noah Wardrip-Fruin, American professor
Noah Warren, Canadian-American poet
Noah Watts (born 1983), American actor
Noah Webster (1758–1843), American lexicographer
Noah Weißhaupt (born 2001), German footballer
Noah Wekesa (born 1936), Kenyan politician
Noah Welch (born 1982), American ice hockey player
Noah Wenger (born 1934), American politician
Noah Williams (disambiguation), multiple people
Noah Worcester (1758–1837), American clergyman
Noah Wunsch (born 1970), German painter
Noah Wyle (born 1971), American actor

Y
Noah Yap (born 1993), Singaporean actor
Noah Young (1887–1958), American weightlifter

Z
Noah Zane (1778–1833), American politician

Fictional characters
Noah Bennet from Heroes
Noah Bennett from Passions
Noah Claypole from Oliver Twist
Noah Drake from General Hospital
Noah Lawson from Home and Away
Noah Newman from The Young and the Restless
Noah van Helsing from Marvel Comics
Noah from Total Drama
Noah from Xenoblade Chronicles 3
Noah Solloway from The Affair

Notable people with the surname "Noah" include
Akie Noah, Sierra Leonean footballer
Barbara Noah (born 1949), American sculptor
David Noah, Indonesian keyboardist
Gabriel Noah (born 1986), Cameroonian footballer
George Noah (born 1957), Nigerian journalist
Harith Noah (born 1993), Indian motorsports athlete
Harold J. Noah (1925–2019), American educator
Joakim Noah (born 1985), French-American basketball player
John Noah (1927–2015), American ice hockey player
Kalleem Noah (1868–1952), Lebanese-Canadian businessman
Max W. Noah (1932–2018), American lieutenant general
Mohamed Abdullahi Hassan Noah, Somali politician
Mordecai Manuel Noah (1785–1851), American playwright
Nutty Noah, English entertainer
Olajuwon Noah (born 1989), Samoan rugby union footballer
Peter Noah, American television producer
Rahah Noah (1933–2020), Malaysian social figure
Timothy Noah (born 1958), American writer
Trevor Noah (born 1984), South African comedian
Uki Noah (born 1981), Indonesian guitarist
William Noah (born 1944), Canadian politician
Yannick Noah (born 1960), French tennis player
Zacharie Noah (1937–2017), Cameroonian footballer

See also
Noa (disambiguation), a disambiguation page for "Noa"
Noah (disambiguation), a disambiguation page for "Noah"

References 

Given names of Hebrew language origin
Hebrew masculine given names
English masculine given names